The glucagon receptor is a 62 kDa protein that is activated by glucagon and is a member of the class B G-protein coupled family of receptors, coupled to G alpha i, Gs and to a lesser extent G alpha q. Stimulation of the receptor results in the activation of adenylate cyclase and phospholipase C and in increased levels of the secondary messengers intracellular cAMP and calcium. In humans, the glucagon receptor is encoded by the  gene.

Glucagon receptors are mainly expressed in liver and in kidney with lesser amounts found in heart, adipose tissue, spleen, thymus, adrenal glands, pancreas, cerebral cortex, and  gastrointestinal tract.

Signal transduction pathway 
A glucagon receptor, upon binding with the signaling molecule glucagon, initiates a signal transduction pathway that begins with the activation of adenylate cyclase, which in turn produces cyclic AMP (cAMP). Protein kinase A, whose activation is dependent on the increased levels of cAMP, is responsible for the ensuing cellular response in the form of protein kinase 1 and 2. The ligand-bound glucagon receptor can also initiate a concurrent signaling pathway that is independent of cAMP by activating phospholipase C. Phospholipase C produces DAG and IP3 from PIP2, a phospholipid phospholipase C cleaves off of the plasma membrane. Ca2+ stores inside the cell release Ca2+ when its calcium channels are bound by IP3.

Structure

The 3D crystallographic structures of the seven transmembrane helical domain (7TM) and the extracellular domain (ECD) and an electron microscopy (EM) map of full length glucagon receptor have been determined. Furthermore, the structural dynamics of an active state complex of the Glucagon receptor, Glucagon, the Receptor activity-modifying protein, and the G-protein C-terminus has been determined using a computational and experimental approach.

Clinical significance 

A missense mutation at 17q25 in the GCGR gene is associated with diabetes mellitus type 2.

Inactivating mutation of glucagon receptor in humans causes resistance to glucagon and is associated with pancreatic alpha cell hyperplasia, nesidioblastosis, hyperglucagonemia, and pancreatic neuroendocrine tumors, also known as Mahvash disease.

References

Further reading 

 
 
 
 
 
 
 
 
 
 
 
 
 

G protein-coupled receptors